Roscoe Conkling Brown Jr. (March 9, 1922 – July 2, 2016) was one of the Tuskegee Airmen and a squadron commander of the 100th Fighter Squadron of the 332nd Fighter Group.

Career
He was appointed to this position in June 1945, which was after VE Day (May 8, 1945). During combat, he served as a flight leader and operations officer only. He graduated from the Tuskegee Flight School on March 12, 1944 as member of class 44-C-SE and served in the U.S. Army Air Forces in Europe during World War II. During this period, on March 24, 1945 mission to Berlin Captain Brown shot down a German Me 262 jet fighter and several days later, on March 31, a Fw 190 fighter (he is credited as the first 15th Air Force pilot to shoot down a jet). He was awarded the Distinguished Flying Cross.

 
Prior to his wartime service, he graduated from Springfield College, Springfield, Massachusetts, where he was valedictorian of the Class of 1943. After the war, Brown resumed his education. His doctoral dissertation at New York University was on exercise physiology.

Brown became a professor at New York University and directed the NYU Institute of Afro-American Affairs (now the Institute of African American Affairs) in 1950. Brown hosted The Soul of Reason, a radio talk show with interviewees which included politicians, professional athletes, medical professionals, and contemporary artists, which aired between 1971 and 1986. Brown also hosted Black Arts (1970–71) and CUNY TV show African American Legends. Brown was President of Bronx Community College from 1977 to 1993 and director for the Center for Education Policy at the City University of New York. Among his many distinguished awards, honors, and recognitions, he was elected into the National Academy of Kinesiology (née American Academy of Physical Education) in 1971 as an Associate Fellow. In 1992, Brown received an honorary doctor of humanics degree from his alma mater, Springfield College.

Personal
Brown was born in Washington, D.C. in 1922. His father, Roscoe C. Brown Sr. (1884–1963), was a dentist and an official in the United States Public Health Service who was born as George Brown and had changed his name to honor Roscoe Conkling, a strong supporter of the rights of African Americans during Reconstruction. His mother was the former Vivian Kemp, a teacher.

On March 29, 2007, Brown attended a ceremony in the U.S. Capitol rotunda, where he and the other Tuskegee Airmen were collectively awarded the Congressional Gold Medal in recognition of their service.

He was also a member and past president of the 100 Black Men of America New York Chapter. and professor of Urban Education at the CUNY Graduate Center. Brown died on July 2, 2016 at Montefiore Medical Center in the Bronx, N.Y. at the age of 94. He had resided in Riverdale in his latter years. His ashes were interred at Arlington National Cemetery on what would have been his 95th birthday, March 9, 2017.

See also
 Executive Order 9981
 List of Tuskegee Airmen
 Military history of African Americans

References

External links

Biography CUNY-TV
Interview BuildingNY with Michael Stoler, May 24, 2012
Guide to the Records of the Institute of African American Affairs (RG.9.8) finding aid, http://dlib.nyu.edu/findingaids/html/archives/iaaa/scopecontent.html

1922 births
2016 deaths
United States Army Air Forces pilots of World War II
Tuskegee Airmen
Congressional Gold Medal recipients
Tuskegee University
People from the Bronx
African-American aviators
Aviators from Washington, D.C.
Recipients of the Distinguished Flying Cross (United States)
Springfield College (Massachusetts) alumni
New York University alumni
Steinhardt School of Culture, Education, and Human Development faculty
Bronx Community College faculty
Burials at Arlington National Cemetery
Presidents of Bronx Community College
21st-century African-American people